Nacional Records is an independent record label based in Los Angeles, California. It is home to numerous artists including Manu Chao, Grammy-nominated Mexican electronica group Nortec Collective, Colombian rock band Aterciopelados, Argentine rock group Los Fabulosos Cadillacs, American new wave band Tom Tom Club, and French-Chilean hip-hop artist Ana Tijoux.

History
Nacional Records was founded by Tomas Cookman in 2005. Cookman is the president and owner of Cookman International, a multi-faceted company that specializes in artist management, publishing, marketing, special events such as the Latin Alternative Music Conference (LAMC) and Supersonico, original content (La Hora Nacional TV show on MTV Tr3s and weekly radio show, LAMC Mixtape on SiriusXM) and the Latino Loop (a weekly industry newsletter emailed to over 100,000 tastemakers) among other endeavors.
 
The label's first album release was Aterciopelados lead singer Andrea Echeverri's self-titled solo album on March 8, 2005. It went on to be nominated for both a Grammy and a Latin Grammy. Since then, Nacional has released more than 100 albums, winning its first Latin Grammy in 2007 with Aterciopelados' Oye as Best Alternative Album and Manu Chao's "Me Llaman Calle" as Best Alternative Song. Other achievements since then include 51 Latin Grammy and Grammy wins and nominations.
 
Nacional Records released the first-ever Starbucks compilation of modern Latin music, Café Con Musica, which debuted at #1 on the Billboard World and Latin Pop charts. 
 
Nacional Records music has appeared in many top movies, videogames, TV shows and commercials, including Breaking Bad, Jersey Shore, No Reservations with Anthony Bourdain, EA Sports' FIFA Games Series, Need For Speed, Jack & Jill, Fast Food Nation, Entourage, CSI Miami, Ugly Betty, Target, ESPN and others.

Since May 2013, Nacional Records and Search Party Music created together El Search Party, a new venture focusing on Latin music placement and licensing
 
In a June 2009 article about Nacional, Cookman was hailed as a "self-propelled phenom", by Jonny Whiteside in LA Weekly.

Artists and releases (past and present)
4to Poder
Álex Anwandter
Ana Tijoux
Andrea Echeverri
Astro
Aterciopelados
Banda de Turistas
Bitman & Roban
Black Uhuru
Bomba Estereo
Ceci Bastida
Choc Quib Town
Diego Garcia
DJ Bitman
DJ Raff
El Guincho
Él Mató a un Policía Motorizado
Elastic Bond
Eric Bobo
Fidel Nadal 
Fyahbwoy
Gonzalo Yañez
Hector Buitrago
Hello Seahorse!
Intoxicados
Jarabe de Palo
Jungle Fire
KCRW Sounds Eclectico
King Coya
Kinky Sueño de la Máquina 
La Bien Querida
La Casa Azul
La mujer de mi hermano Soundtrack
La Vida Bohème
Latin Bitman
Los Amigos Invisibles
Los Bunkers
Los Fabulosos Cadillacs
Los Macuanos
Los Nastys
Los Tres
Los Updates (digital release only)
Maldita Vecindad
Manu Chao
Mark Cast
Matorral Man
Mexican Institute of Sound
Mexrrissey
Misterio
Monareta 
Monica Lionheart
Natalia Clavier
Nicole
Nortec Collective
Nortec Collective Presents: Bostich and Fussible
Nortec Collective Presents: Clorofila
Ovni (digital release only)
Pacha Massive
Pecker (digital release only)
Plastilina Mosh
Quiero Club
Raul Campos
Raul Y Mexia
Red Hot + Latin Redux (compilation)
RH+
Ritmo Machine
Rizha
Sam Bates
Santé Les Amis
Sara Valenzuela
Señor Coconut
Señor Flavio
Systema Solar
The Chamanas
The Echocentrics
The Pinker Tones
Todos Tus Muertos
Tonino Carotone
Student Teachers
Vlammen
Willie Bobo
Zizek

References

External links

 Nacional Records MySpace
Nacional Records Facebook
Nacional Records Twitter

Record labels based in California
Latin American music record labels
Alternative rock record labels
Record labels established in 2005
Companies based in Los Angeles
2005 establishments in California